The ECW World Heavyweight Championship was a professional wrestling world heavyweight championship in Extreme Championship Wrestling (ECW) and World Wrestling Entertainment (WWE). It was the original world title of the Extreme Championship Wrestling promotion, later used in WWE as the world title of the ECW brand and one of three in WWE, complementing the WWE Championship and World Heavyweight Championship. It was introduced as the ECW Heavyweight Championship on April 25, 1992. Originally a part of the Eastern Championship Wrestling promotion, which joined the National Wrestling Alliance (NWA) on September 18, 1993. It was established as a world heavyweight championship in August 1994 following the promotion's secession from the NWA. The promotion became Extreme Championship Wrestling and the title became the ECW World Heavyweight Championship. It remained active until April 11, 2001, when ECW was closed and WWE subsequently purchased its assets. WWE relaunched ECW as a WWE brand in June 2006 with the title being recommissioned and designated as the ECW brand's world title. The brand dissolved February 16, 2010, rendering the title inactive.

The championship was contested in professional wrestling matches, in which participants execute scripted finishes rather than contend in direct competition. All title changes occurred at ECW or WWE shows. The inaugural champion was Jimmy Snuka, who defeated Salvatore Bellomo in a tournament final on April 25, 1992, to become the first ECW Heavyweight Champion. WWE, however, does not recognize the ECW Heavyweight Championship reigns from April 1992 through August 1994. Instead, they recognize Shane Douglas' second reign, which originally began on March 26, 1994, but is recognized as starting on August 27, 1994 – the same day the championship was renamed the ECW World Heavyweight Championship – as the inception of the title's history. The Sandman holds the record for most reigns, with five. At 406 days, Douglas' fourth reign is the longest in the title's history. Ezekiel Jackson's only reign was the shortest in the history of the title as it was retired as soon as he won it. He defeated the previous champion, Christian, on February 16, 2010, at an ECW television taping event. Overall, there have been 49 reigns among 32 wrestlers, with 1 vacancy, and 2 deactivations.

Reigns

Names

Reigns

Combined reigns

See also
List of former championships in WWE
World championships in WWE

References
 General

 Specific

External links
ECW World Heavyweight Championship on WWE.com

Extreme Championship Wrestling championships
ECW World Heavyweight Championship

de:ECW Championship#Liste der Titelträger